Euproctis apoblepta is a moth of the  family Erebidae. It is found in Madagascar.

The male of this species has a wingspan of 35 mm.
Head and front are bright orange-yellow,  antennae with yellow flagellum and brownish black pectinations, thorax, abdomen and legs are orange-yellow. The legs are strongly hairy.

Forewings orange-yellow with a large grey discal part.

References

Lymantriinae
Moths described in 1953
Moths of Madagascar